The Alqueva Dam is an arch dam and the centrepiece of the Alqueva Multipurpose Project. It impounds the River Guadiana, on the border of Beja and Évora Districts in south of Portugal. The dam takes its name from the town of Alqueva to its right bank. It creates a large reservoir with an inter-annual regulation capacity from which water may be distributed throughout the region. The dam was completed in 2002 and its reservoir reached the full level, for the first time, in 2010. The  power station was commissioned in two stages, stage I in 2004 and stage II in 2013. The Alqueva Dam is the largest dam and artificial lake in Western Europe.

History
During the 1950s, the Portuguese Prime Minister, António de Oliveira Salazar, ordered a study of the feasibility of the dam project. The potential benefits of the Alqueva dam were discussed for decades. An initial effort was undertaken after the Carnation Revolution of 1974, but it was abandoned in 1978. The Portuguese government eventually made a firm decision to build the dam in the 1990s, during the Cavaco Silva and António Guterres governments.

Aldeia da Luz, a small village that lay in the projected flood zone of the dam, was completely rebuilt on a new site.

The construction of the new dam was carried out by a joint venture of Bento Pedroso Construções, Cubiertas y MZOV, Dragados and Somague – Sociedade de Construções. 
 
In January 2010 the lake was filled to the planned level, with a surface area of 250 km2. When filled to capacity, the shoreline of Alqueva Lake, also known as Grande Lago, is nearly 1200 kilometers and the maximum depth is about 100 meters. A well-developed commercial marina has grown-up to the southeast of the town of Amieira, which provides all types of boating services.

Hydroelectric power station
The second stage, with an additional 259 MW, was commissioned in 2013. The power station contains four  reversible Francis turbines. With these turbines, the power station is afforded a pumped-storage capability. Power is generated during high demand periods and at times of low demand, the turbines reverse and pump water from a much smaller reservoir below the dam back into the main reservoir. Pedrogao Dam forms the lower reservoir.

Supporting infrastructure
The purpose of the Pedrógão dam is the creation of a lower reservoir for the Alqueva, for the recovery of flows, also serving as a source of water for the Ardila and Pedrógão water supply subsystems. The Álamos pumping station takes water from Alqueva and distributes it throughout the entire  Alqueva water supply subsystem. Another two pumping stations, Pedrógão/Left Bank and Pedrógão/Right Bank, distribute water to the Ardila and Pedrógão subsystems respectively. The main infrastructure also includes the primary and secondary networks, pumping stations, intermediate dams, reservoirs and drainage and road networks.

A 5 MW floating solar facility is also being installed, with an option for 70 MW more.

Benefits
The goals of the Alqueva Multi-Purpose Project have been based on the principal shortfalls of the Alentejo region. The answers to these needs make up the project's main goals:
The establishment of a strategic water reserve, with a capacity sufficient to meet all the needs of at least three successive years of drought;
Guaranteed water supply to the population, industries and agriculture within the project intervention area;
The production of non-polluting electrical energy using renewable sources;
The preservation of the environment, monitoring and actively participating in the improvement of the same;
The promotion of quality tourism by means of cooperation with public and private entities, the execution of Land Use Plans and systematic efforts to ensure the sustainability of the interventions;
The creation of a new Corporate Climate, assuring the resource of "water",  meeting the goals for the implementation of the project and helping to provide solutions for investment in the region;
The dynamization of the employment market, a direct consequence of the other goals, is vital to the reversal of the main regional statistical indicators.

Destruction

The dam caused the loss of prehistoric engravings and habitat of rare and endangered species including eagles, kites, wild boars, and the Iberian lynx. A Roman fort was also submerged.

The Alqueva Multi Purpose Project has a strong financial investment in impact mitigation plans. The archaeological intervention of about 1,200 cultural heritage sites is one result.

An environmental leader, José Paulo Martins, said the dam is a waste of money, as "the government's own secret reports say only 48% of the irrigated land can be worked profitably".

Gallery

References

External links

Official
EDIA – Empresa de Desenvolvimento e Infra-Estruturas do Alqueva (Corporate website of the state company responsible for the management of Alqueva system)
Alqueva – A fresh new land (Promotional website run by the state company responsible for the management of Alqueva system)
Other
 Alqueva.com
 About Alqueva
 3D model

Dams completed in 2002
Energy infrastructure completed in 2004
Energy infrastructure completed in 2013
Dams in Portugal
Pumped-storage hydroelectric power stations in Portugal
Arch dams
2002 establishments in Portugal
Buildings and structures in Évora District
Buildings and structures in Beja District
Guadiana